The Estadio Municipal de San Cristóbal de las Casas is a multi-use stadium located in San Cristóbal de las Casas, Chiapas, Mexico.  It is currently used mostly for football matches and is the home stadium for Ocelotes UNACH.  The stadium has a capacity of 4,000 people.

References

External links

Sports venues in Chiapas
Municipal de San Cristóbal de las Casas
Athletics (track and field) venues in Mexico